Will Butler (born 17 April 1998) is an English rugby union player. His main position is centre.

Early life
Butler started playing rugby aged seven at Ledbury RFC and stayed with them through to Under 17 level, representing Herefordshire, North Midlands and England Lions Under 16s along the way. Butler joined the Worcester Warriors set-up aged 14 and made his way up the age-groups, helping the Under 18s to Finals Day success both in 2016 and 2017, as they beat both Exeter Chiefs and Saracens.

Club career
Will Butler came through the Warriors junior academy before joining the senior academy in the summer of 2016. In his first season at Sixways, Butler was a regular for Worcester Cavaliers and was handed his first-team debut in a European Rugby Challenge Cup clash in Moscow against Enisei-STM. An injury sustained during the game in Russia kept him out for most of the season.

On 20 December 2018, Butler signed a two-year professional contract to stay with Worcester, thus promoted to the senior squad from the 2019–20 season.

An elbow injury, sustained in the Premiership Rugby Sevens Series in August 2018, further disrupted Butler's progress but he returned to action in December and impressed for Cavaliers, who he captained in the Premiership Rugby Shield. Butler suffered a further setback when he sustained an ankle injury on his seasonal debut at Bath in September 2019 and was ruled out for four months. He returned to action against Enisei-STM in the European Challenge Cup in January 2020 as a second-half replacement and marked his return with a try.

He was appointed Warriors Assistant Club Captain in July 2020. Butler led Worcester in away Premiership matches against Wasps and Exeter Chiefs in August 2020.

On 5 October 2022 all Worcester players had their contacts terminated due to the liquidation of the company to which they were contracted.

International career
Butler scored two tries on his England Under 17s debut against France and played his first game at Under 18 level against the corresponding French team in February 2016. Butler was also part of the England U20s squad which won the 2017 Six Nations Under 20 Championship, beating Scotland 33–5 in the finals. He was also part of the squad that reached the final of the 2017 World Rugby Under 20 Championship, where they were defeated by New Zealand.

References

External links
Worcester Warriors Profile
ESPN Profile
Its Rugby Profile
Ultimate Rugby Profile

Living people
1998 births
English rugby union players
Rugby union players from Sutton Coldfield
Worcester Warriors players
Rugby union locks